Brian Clarke (born 1953) is a British architectural and stained glass artist.

Brian Clarke may also refer to:

 Brian Clarke (footballer, born 1968), English former footballer
 Brian Clarke (Gaelic footballer), Irish Gaelic footballer
 Brian Patrick Clarke (born 1952), American actor
 Brian Clarke (author) (born 1938), English author, journalist and angler

See also 
 Bryan Clarke, British scientist
 Brian Clark (disambiguation)
 Ryan Clarke (disambiguation)